A labour code, (also called a code of labour laws) is a codification of labour laws in legislative form.

One of the first labour codes was first introduced in 1918 in the Russian Soviet Federative Socialist Republic, as a legal framework underlying the requirement to ensure the right to work declared in the first Soviet Constitution.

In the aftermath of post-war the labour codes basing upon the same set of social guarantees were introduced in German Democratic Republic, People's Republic of Hungary, People's Republic of Poland and the other socialist countries in Central and Eastern Europe.

Presently the Labour Code exists in Russian Federation and in some other former Soviet Republics.

In Canada the Labour Code (R.S., 1985, c. L-2) was adopted in 1985 superseding the Industrial Relations and Disputes Investigation Act of 1948.

India 
Parliament of India passed four labour codes in 2019 and 2020 sessions. Together, these four codes merged 44 existing labour laws.

 The Industrial Relations Code 2020
 The Code on Social Security 2020
 The Occupational Safety, Health and Working Conditions Code, 2020
 The Code on Wages 2019

USSR 
, abbr. КЗОТ, "KZOT").

On July 10, 1918 the 5th All-Russian Congress of Soviets adopted the Constitution of Russia which declared the right and duty to work for all citizen. Pursuant to this the All-Russian Central Executive Committee approved the Code of Labour Laws  and the "Regulations on employment record books" as an Appendix to the Article 80 of this Code.

German Democratic Republic 
, abbr. AGB).

Czech Republic 

The new labour code of the Czech Republic No.262/2006 Sb. effective from January 1, 2007, superseded the Code of 65/1965.

See also
International Labour Code

References

Labor relations
Socialism
Labour law
Employment compensation
Working conditions
Working time